Ławy may refer to the following places:
Ławy, Kuyavian-Pomeranian Voivodeship (north-central Poland)
Ławy, Łódź Voivodeship (central Poland)
Ławy, Świętokrzyskie Voivodeship (south-central Poland)
Ławy, Łosice County in Masovian Voivodeship (east-central Poland)
Ławy, Ostrołęka County in Masovian Voivodeship (east-central Poland)
Ławy, Warsaw West County in Masovian Voivodeship (east-central Poland)
Ławy, West Pomeranian Voivodeship (north-west Poland)